Highway 321 is a highway in the Canadian province of Saskatchewan. It runs from Highway 21 near Liebenthal to the Alberta border, where it becomes Highway 545.

Highway 321 also connects with Highway 635. It passes near the town of Burstall near the Alberta border.

References

321